Mighty Max is an American animated action/horror television series that aired from 1 September 1993, to 2 December 1994, based upon the British Mighty Max toys, an outgrowth of the Polly Pocket line, created by Bluebird Toys in 1992. It ran for two seasons, with a total of 40 episodes airing during the show's run.

Plot
The series follows Max, an adventurous teenage boy who receives in the mail a small statue of a fowl, inscribed with Egyptian hieroglyphs whereof the translation states: "You have been chosen to be the cap-bearer. Go to the mini-mart and wait for a sign, Mighty Max". Shocked by the message, Max drops the statue, shattering it and revealing a red baseball cap emblazoned with a yellow "M", which he dons. The cap is capable of projecting wormhole-like "portals" through which Max can teleport across space and time.

Upon arriving at the mini-mart, Max is chased by a lava-monster sent by antagonist 'Skullmaster'. As Max flees, the cap teleports them to the Mongolian desert, where he befriends Virgil, a nearly omniscient Lemurian whose appearance is that of an anthropomorphic "fowl" (a running gag in the series is that Max refers to Virgil as a "chicken" to which the Lemurian replies "Fowl, actually"), who explains that Max's reception of the cap was prophesied c. 3000 B.C. Thereafter Max, Virgil, and Norman, his Viking bodyguard, travel together around the world, defending Earth against the minions of Skullmaster, who is responsible for the downfall of the Lemurians. Norman is supposedly immortal and identified as or with Sir Lancelot, Thor, Samson, and Hercules. Most plot-driving episodes involve Skullmaster or one of his monstrous followers; but in many episodes, Max is required to stop an independent villain. While all episodes involve travel across Earth, one involves time travel, and the portal can even extend into the astral plane (as seen in the episode "Souls of Talon").

While generally lighthearted and comical, the show's violence and descriptions of violent acts were considered excessive by some viewers. Many episodes began with a depiction of the story's principal monster killing a victim, whereas the series finale featured Max, Norman, and Virgil pitted against Skullmaster and their previously defeated foes. Both Norman and Virgil are killed, leaving Max to defeat Skullmaster. Unable to do so, Max uses the cap in order to time travel to the events of the first episode, creating a time paradox. At first, he experiences déjà vu, but after he reads Virgil's modified letter, he recalls everything, and decides to use the knowledge he gained from the initial timeline to set it right in order to defeat Skullmaster once and for all.

Characters

Heroes
 Max (voiced by Rob Paulsen) – Max is the protagonist of the series: a rambunctious, clever, and blond teen empowered, through a series of adventures, to protect the signature cap that enables travel through various places. Max sometimes claims reluctance to retain this role, but Virgil and the cap leave him with little choice.
 Virgil/Narrator (voiced by Tony Jay) – Virgil, a fowl-like humanoid, is the last living Lemurian, and Max's mentor. He is over ten thousand years old, and knowledgeable of both past and future, but often frustrated by Max's carefree ways (which include teasingly calling Virgil a "chicken") and frequently reminded of having mentored Skullmaster, who consequently destroyed his people later on. Virgil would often send unusual messages to Max on where to go in order to get taken through a portal to meet up with him.
 Norman (voiced by Richard Moll as an adult, Jason Marsden as a child) – Norman is Max's bodyguard who, after failing to prevent his father's defeat, vowed to become the greatest warrior that ever lived (cf. "Norman's Conquest"). After a lifetime of battle, Norman was appointed by Virgil to his current role. He earned his immortality by defeating the Conqueror, an undefeated champion, and swore to defend the Mighty One with his life if necessary (cf. "Dawn of the Conqueror"). As the Mighty One's bodyguard, Norman is usually serious but, unlike Virgil, seems to enjoy Max's carefree ways. Norman's exploits through the ages were the basis of numerous legends, including those of Thor, Hercules, Samson, Lancelot, and Little John. Norman is shown throughout the series to be fearless, but not above disgust and has a fear of spiders. It is hinted in the final episode that he may have finally met his match in combat and died at the hands of an enormous spider. His common catchphrase is, "I eat [X] for breakfast", usually naming his enemy. Another is the wry statement made upon meeting one of the many monsters they encounter, "That is a big [X]".

Allies
 Max's Mother (voiced by Tress MacNeille) – A blonde archaeologist who works for the local museum. She often travels all over the world and usually leaves Max to his own devices. More than once Max has had to rescue her; but despite misgivings, she and Virgil often have historical discussions and she is one of the few people who can out-talk Virgil.
 Bea (voiced by Kath Soucie) – Bea is one of Max's two best friends. Bea is an intelligent young girl who has assisted and sometimes rescued Max. Level-headed and cool under pressure, she often balances Max's exuberance with a more intellectual approach.
 Felix (voiced by Corey Burton) – Felix is Max's friend who takes Max's new heroism in stride. Felix has assisted Max on numerous occasions, but usually gets left behind when the adventure starts, only to be relied upon thereafter.
 Thor – Thor is Max's pet green iguana and loyal companion. During Max's first encounter with antagonist Dr. Zygote, Thor was "devolved" into a dinosaur and ended up rescuing Max from Zygote's Tyrannosaurus rex-like "Mutosaurus" (as seen in "Zygote's Rhythm"). Later, Max "devolved" Thor back into his usual, pocket-sized self.

Villains
 Skullmaster (voiced by Tim Curry) – The main villain of the series and the nemesis of the Mighty One. Skullmaster is an ancient warrior/sorcerer whose lust for power has driven him to destroy the Lemurians. Afterward, Skullmaster was imprisoned underground after the final battle with Max's predecessor Maximus where he took command of the inhabitants there. During the second season, Skullmaster is freed to roam the earth itself and seeks to control the universe.
 Warmonger (voiced by Frank Welker) – Warmonger is a demon and Skullmaster's errand runner. Cruel and sadistic, he briefly showed ambition when he tried to kill Skullmaster in the episode "I, Warmonger", but found himself ignorant of what to do with his newfound power and position. The death of Skullmaster proved to be a ruse and Skullmaster himself was proud of Warmonger for showing such deviousness.
 Rock Monsters – A race of rock monsters that serve Skullmaster.
 Skeleturtles – A race of skeletal turtles that serve Skullmaster.
 Lava Lord (voiced by Frank Welker) – Lava Lord is the previous ruler of Underworld, dethroned and sealed in solid rock by Skullmaster. At the beginning of season 2, Lava Lord was freed and recovered the allegiance of the Lava Beasts. He planned to destroy Skullmaster with a giant robot called Magusn. Though Lava Lord has no love for humans, his hatred for Skullmaster has caused him to align with Max on more than one occasion.
 Magus – A giant lava-powered robot working for Lava Lord who treated it like his own son.
 Lava Beasts – Creatures of molten rock that served Lava Lord until his defeat by Skullmaster, and later restored to him.
 Cyberskull (voiced by Danny Goldman) – Marlin Curt is a programmer who merged with a computer virus and discovered that he can alter reality and become electricity. He plotted revenge on the founder of MegaCorp for stealing his ideas. Cyberskull later returned to create a physical body for himself.
 Professor Eggbert Zygote (voiced by Kenneth Mars) – Eggbert Zygote is a mad scientist with plans to manipulate evolution. In his first appearance in "Zygote's Rhythm", he developed a machine that devolved reptilian life to their dinosaur forms. Max unintentionally evolves him into a form with a large brain. Zygote escapes into the sea following the fight. In "Zygote Music", Zygote has mastered the psychic abilities that came with his new form. He captures a telepathic boy whom he believes to be the key to human evolution. He is "defeated" when he evolves into a being of pure consciousness, losing interest in "such primitive concepts as good and evil".
 Arachnoid (voiced by René Auberjonois) – Dr. Stanley Kirby is a scientist who was mutated into the half-spider Arachnoid.
 Talon (voiced by David Warner) – A giant skull-like entity that feeds on the souls of the living. He requires Mighty Max's cap to escape from the astral plane into our dimension. In "Armageddon Outta Here", Skullmaster uses Talon to carry a message to Max to show up at Stonehenge or else he will kill Virgil.
 Fuath – A gigantic clockwork stone golem that was created by a sect of druids to plan revenge on humanity. Max, Virgil, and Norman were able to defeat Fuath by taking out the crystal that powered it. In "Armageddon Outta Here", Skullmaster summon Fuath to fight Lava Lord and Magus.

List of episodes

Cast
 Corey Burton – Felix
 Tim Curry – Skullmaster, Jules Verne
 Tony Jay – Virgil/Narrator
 Tress MacNeille – Max's Mother
 Richard Moll – Norman
 Rob Paulsen – Max
 Kath Soucie – Bea
 Frank Welker – Warmonger, Lava Lord

Additional voices
 Charlie Adler – Calimarus, Ernie, Football Coach
 René Auberjonois – Arachnoid, Nadja
 Michael Bell – Hydra (Good Side)
 Hamilton Camp –
 Glen Chin – Lao Chu/Ki Wan
 Jim Cummings – Beowulf, Conqueror, Doom Dragon, J. "Ollie" Oleander Pettybone, sorcerer Ravendark
 Miriam Flynn – Professor MacDougal
 Brad Garrett – Spike
 Linda Gary – Kali
 Ellen Gerstell –
 Danny Goldman – Marlin Curt/Cyberskull
 Dorian Harewood –
 Michael Horse – Yana-Ya-In
 Charles Kimbrough – Dr. Robert Scorpio
 Clyde Kusatsu – Hanuman
 Katie Leigh – Jiffy
 Victor Love –
 Kenneth Mars – Professor Eggbert Zygote
 Jason Marsden – Young Norman
 Kate Mulgrew – Isis
 Ron Perlman – Goar
 Henry Polic II – Nemo
 Roger Rees –
 Neil Ross – Hydra (Bad Side)
 Michael Fenton Stevens
 Paula Tiso –
 B.J. Ward – Mrs. Fudder
 David Warner – Talon
 Olivia Virgil White – Mujaji
 Paul Williams – Mad Scientist
 JoBeth Williams – Countess Moska
 Bill Woodson – Woman

Crew
 Gordon Hunt – Voice Director
 Phil Roman – Executive Producer
 Mark Zaslove – Story Editor (season 1)
 Gordon Bressack – Story Editor (season 2)

Availability
Select episodes of the show were released on VHS in NTSC and PAL formats.

The series has never been available on DVD or any digital service.

Epilogue
In all episodes, a short ending scene preludes the credits, wherein Max is shown at his desk in his room, where he discusses with the audience some aspect of the episode in an educational way (similar to other children's cartoon series, including The Magic School Bus), usually the location where the events took place, the type of monster that was fought, etc. Occasionally, Max is shown in another setting such as a library or museum, or is simply heard recorded on an answering machine (such as "Armageddon Outta Here", the series finale); but these sequences were not broadcast on some channels, such as the British terrestrial airings on BBC1 (though included on the Nickelodeon airings). Generally, the educational messages at the end of each shows were of scientific, historical, or cultural significance (for example, the mythology of another culture; new astronomical theories of the time; the biology of a giant squid; or the fact that Native Americans were first believed to be Indians by European explorers).

In addition to the epilogue, facts are unobtrusively given in show, often by Virgil's comment.

Merchandise

The merchandising was far more popular than the show itself. Mighty Max toys were sold as play-sets of varying sizes with very small (usually non-articulated) figurines inside. Each play-set contained a Mighty Max figure as well as one or more villains and sometimes Virgil, Norman, or both. There were a small series of larger, more expensive play-sets with various mechanical and electronic features such as opening jaws (on an island play-set shaped as a dragon's head) and lights. Almost all episodes of the TV series were based at least loosely on one of the Mighty Max play-sets.

In 1994, due to the popularity of the play-sets at the time, the McDonald's Happy Meal offered a toy play-set featuring Mighty Max.

In February 1995, a video game, The Adventures of Mighty Max, was released for the SNES and Sega Genesis/Mega Drive (which were packaged with a VHS copy of Day of the Cyclops and Let Sleeping Dragons Lie, respectively.) A handheld game was also released by Tiger Electronics and Systema.

The show generated other merchandise such as a comic book (10 issues), a sticker album, at least one puzzle, and board games. In some countries, replicas of Max's cap were sold, although not all are officially licensed merchandise.

References

External links

 
 The Mighty Max Portal (fan site)
 
 

1990s American animated television series
1993 American television series debuts
1994 American television series endings
1990s British animated television series
1993 British television series debuts
1994 British television series endings
1990s French animated television series
1993 French television series debuts
1994 French television series endings
First-run syndicated television programs in the United States
Fiction about wormholes
USA Action Extreme Team
BBC children's television shows
American children's animated action television series
American children's animated adventure television series
American children's animated horror television series
American children's animated science fantasy television series
British children's animated action television series
British children's animated adventure television series
British children's animated horror television series
British children's animated science fantasy television series
French children's animated action television series
French children's animated adventure television series
French children's animated horror television series
French children's animated science fantasy television series
Television shows based on Mattel toys
Television shows adapted into video games
Lemuria (continent) in fiction
Television series by Film Roman
Television series by Universal Television
Television series by Mattel Creations